Dee Shulman (born 1957) is a British author and illustrator of novels for children and young adults.

Biography 

Dee Shulman was born in Johannesburg, and studied English at York University and illustration at Harrow School of Art. Her first book, Feminist Graffiti, was published while she was studying at Harrow. After finishing art school, she worked as a storyboard artist and freelance illustrator on magazines and books. Her first children’s picture book, One Day Janie (Puffin) was inspired by her 2-year-old daughter. Since then she has written and/or illustrated over 50 books for children, and has been shortlisted for the FCB award, and longlisted for the Waterstones Children’s Book Prize.
	
In 2008 the first Polly Price book was published – My Totally Secret Diary: On Stage in America, and was followed two years later by My Totally Secret Diary: Reality TV Nightmare. The 3rd book in the series, Polly Price’s Totally Secret Diary: Mum in Love was published in August 2012. The 4th is due for publication in 2014. Her most widely held book is Hetty and the Yeti, a children's book which, according to WorldCat, is held in 247 libraries and has been translated into Chinese,
In April 2012 Fever, the first novel in her dystopian teenage series, The Parallon Trilogy, was published by Penguin. The 2nd book, Delirium, was published in May 2013, and the third, Afterlife, is due in 2014. Rights to the trilogy have been sold to Germany, Brazil, Israel, Spain, Turkey, Serbia, Poland, France, Russia and China.

Author and illustrator bibliography 

 One Day Janie
 Jessie’s Special Day
 Dora’s New Brother
 Katie’s Special Tooth 
 Roaring Billy
 The Visit
 Grandad and Me
 My Mum
 Aunt Bella’s Cat
 Magenta and the Ghost Babies
 Magenta and the Ghost Bride 
 Magenta and the Ghost School 
 Magenta and the Scary Ghosts 
 Cry in the Dark
 Hetty the Yeti 
 Polly Price’s Totally Secret Diary – On Stage in America
 Polly Price’s Totally Secret Diary – Reality TV Nightmare 
 Polly Price’s Totally Secret Diary – Mum in Love

Illustrator bibliography 

 By Chris Barton
 Cream Cake
 By Michaela Morgan
 Sausage and the Little Visitor 
 Sausage and the Spooks 
 School for Sausage 
 Sausage in Trouble
 Happy Birthday Sausage 
 Cool Clive 
 Cool Clive and the little Pest
 Cool Clive and the Bubble Trouble 
 Cool Clive the Coolest Kid Alive
 Clive Keeps his Cool
 Yum Yuck
 Shelly Holmes, Ace Detective 
 Shelley Holmes, Animal Trainer 
 Woody’s Week 
 Pompom 
 Dustbin
 Pickles Sniffs it out (978-0713638394) 
 Invasion of the Dinner Ladies
 The True Diary of Carly Ann Potter
 By Pat Thompson
 Mary-Anne and the Cat Baby
 By Sally Prue
  The Path of Finn McCool 
 By Ivan Jones
 The Lazy Giant 
 By Hiawyn Oram
 The Good Time Boys
 By Philip Wooderson
 Wilf, the Black Hole and the Poisonous Marigold
 The Baked Bean Cure 
 Dad’s Dodgy Lodger
 The Mincing Machine 
 By Kes Grey and Linda Jennings
 Toffee and Marmalade
 Billy Buzoni and Friends
 Amazing Babies

References

External links 

 Official website
 TTLG Interview

Living people
1957 births
British children's writers
British children's book illustrators
York University alumni
Alumni of the University of Westminster